The Tomb of Seyed Alaeddin Husayn is the Related 10th century Islamic calendar and This building is located in Shiraz.

Gallery

Sources 

Mausoleums in Iran
National works of Iran